What a Wonderful Christmas is an album by Canadian artist Anne Murray. It was released by Straightway Records on October 9, 2001. The album peaked at number 4 on the Billboard Christian Albums chart, number 6 on the Billboard Top Country Albums chart and number 83 on the Billboard 200.

Track listing

Charts

Weekly charts

Year-end charts

References

2001 Christmas albums
Anne Murray albums
Albums produced by Jim Ed Norman
Christmas albums by Canadian artists
Country Christmas albums